The Turks and Caicos Islands is represented at the 2006 Commonwealth Games in Melbourne by a xx-member strong contingent comprising 6 sportspersons and xx officials. Twice as many athletes represented the Turks and Caicos Islands than in Manchester in 2002. The athletes competed in only two sports, athletics and shooting.

Medals

Gold

Silver

Bronze

2006
Nations at the 2006 Commonwealth Games
Commonwealth Games